Pusillimonas harenae is a Gram-negative, oxidase- and catalase-positive, motile bacterium of the genus Pusillimonas, isolated from beach sand on the Taean coast in South Korea.

References

External links
Type strain of Pusillimonas harenae at BacDive -  the Bacterial Diversity Metadatabase

Burkholderiales
Bacteria described in 2011